Wilton Township may refer to the following townships in the United States:

 Wilton Township, Will County, Illinois
 Wilton Township, Iowa
 Wilton Township, Waseca County, Minnesota